South Miami Senior High School is a high school located at 6856 SW 53rd Street in Glenvar Heights, unincorporated Miami-Dade County, Florida, in the United States; located about a mile and a half west of the University of Miami. Its current principal is Mr. Hebert Penton

History
South Miami Senior opened its doors to students on November 10, 1971. It was built to relieve the overcrowding at Southwest Miami High, Coral Park Senior High and Coral Gables High School. The student body selected the Cobra as its mascot. The school's first principal, Warren Burchell, was originally from Ohio and chose the school colors, orange and brown, for the team colors of the NFL Cleveland Browns.

Since opening, South Miami has had eight principals: Dr. Warren G. Burchell, Judy Weiner, Thomas L. Shaw, Eugene Butler, Craig Speziale, Gilberto Bonce, Dr. Cadian Collman-Perez, and Hebert Penton. Dr. Burchell's term was the longest, at 22 years.

Demographics
The school is 84% Hispanic, 8% Black, 7% White non-Hispanic, and 1% Asian.

Notable alumni

Athletics

Baseball
Jose Barrios – former MLB player
Dennis Sherrill – former MLB player

Equestrian
Margie Goldstein-Engle – equestrian show horse champion

Football
 Ed Beckman – former NFL tight end
 Fernanza Burgess – former NFL quarterback
Wayne Capers – former NFL wide receiver
Phil Clarke – former NFL linebacker
John Corker – former NFL linebacker
Damian Harrell – Former Arena Football League wide receiver/defensive back
Paul Hazel – former NFL linebacker
Fred Jones – former NFL player 
Dennis McKinnon – former NFL wide receiver
Derrick Thomas – former NFL linebacker, Pro Football and College Football Hall of Famer

Others
Pitbull - rapper/singer
Marco Rubio – politician
Jeanette Dousdebes Rubio – former Miami Dolphins cheerleader
Ivette Corredero –  runner-up in Big Brother 6
Raúl De Molina –  host of El Gordo y la Flaca
Albert Gonzalez – hacker, convicted of computer fraud
Mia Michaels – choreographer, judge on So You Think You can Dance
Carlos Ponce – singer, songwriter, actor
Julio Robaina – politician

See also
Silver Knight Awards
Miami-Dade County Public Schools
Education in the United States

References

External links
 South Miami Senior High School's official website
 

Educational institutions established in 1971
1971 establishments in Florida
Miami-Dade County Public Schools high schools